National Highway 55 (Previously NH42) is a National Highway in India connecting Sambalpur and Cuttack in Indian state of Odisha. Starting from NH 53 in Maneswar, Sambalpur, it terminates at NH 16, in Manguli Square, Cuttack. it is also known as Cuttack - Sambalpur Highway. Before renumbering of national highways of India, route of NH-55 was part of old national highway 42.

Route 
NH55 connects Sambalpur, Redhakhol, Boinda, Angul, Dhenkanal, and terminates at Cuttack in the state of Odisha.

Junctions  
 
  Terminal near Sambalpur.
  near Redhakhol
  near Angul
  near Banarpal
  near Khuntuni
  near Cuttack.

See also 
 List of National Highways in India
 List of National Highways in India by state

References

External links 

 NH 55 on OpenStreetMap

National highways in India
National Highways in Odisha
Transport in Sambalpur
Transport in Cuttack